Bürgel Abbey is a former Benedictine monastery in the village of Thalbürgel of the town of Bürgel in Saale-Holzland-Kreis district in Thuringia, Germany.

References

External links
 Website of Bürgel Parish at the abbey church (with video)
 Website of the Zinsspeicher Museum Thalbürgel

Benedictine monasteries in Germany
Monasteries in Thuringia
Romanesque architecture in Germany
Buildings and structures in Saale-Holzland-Kreis